Bonoff is a surname. Notable people with the surname include:

Karla Bonoff (born 1951), American singer-songwriter
Terri Bonoff (born 1957), American politician